Kauhiakama (Kauhi-a-Kama) was a king of the island of Maui in ancient Hawaii.

He was a son of King Kamalalawalu and his wife, Queen Piʻilaniwahine I. 

Kauhiakama married Kapukini, who was descended from Līloa. Their child was King Kalanikaumakaowākea.

Kauhiakama made an unsuccessful attempt to conquer the island of Oahu.

References

Royalty of Maui